Lasse Sigurdsen (born 1 June 1997) is a Norwegian football striker who plays for 1. divisjon side KFUM Oslo.

He started his career in Fløy, and played for the senior team  before joining IK Start. He then made his Tippeligaen debut in March 2016 as a last-minute substitute against Lillestrøm. In 2018 he returned to Fløy on loan.

Career statistics

References

1997 births
Living people
Sportspeople from Kristiansand
Norwegian footballers
Flekkerøy IL players
IK Start players
KFUM-Kameratene Oslo players

Eliteserien players
Norwegian First Division players
Association football forwards